In mathematics, an interval exchange transformation is a kind of dynamical system that generalises circle rotation.  The phase space consists of the unit interval, and the transformation acts by cutting the interval into several subintervals, and then permuting these subintervals.  They arise naturally in the study of polygonal billiards and in area-preserving flows.

Formal definition
Consider a vector  of positive real numbers (the widths of the subintervals), satisfying

Define a map  called the interval exchange transformation associated with the pair  as follows. For  let

if  lies in the subinterval .  Thus  acts on each subinterval of the form  by a translation, and it rearranges these subintervals so that the subinterval at position  is moved to position .

Properties
It is continuous except at a finite number of points.

The inverse of the interval exchange transformation  is again an interval exchange transformation.  In fact, it is the transformation  where  for all .

The Weyl equidistribution theorem then asserts that if the length  is irrational, then  is uniquely ergodic.

However, for  there also exist choices of  so that  is ergodic but not uniquely ergodic.

Interval maps have a topological entropy of zero.

Odometers

The dyadic odometer can be understood as an interval exchange transformation of a countable number of intervals. The dyadic odometer is most easily written as the transformation 

defined on the Cantor space  The standard mapping from Cantor space into the unit interval is given by

This mapping is a measure-preserving homomorphism from the Cantor set to the unit interval, in that it maps the standard Bernoulli measure on the Cantor set to the Lebesgue measure on the unit interval. A visualization of the odometer and its first three iterates appear on the right.

Higher dimensions
Two and higher-dimensional generalizations include polygon exchanges, polyhedral exchanges and piecewise isometries.

See also
 Odometer

Notes

References 
 Artur Avila and Giovanni Forni, Weak mixing for interval exchange transformations and translation flows, arXiv:math/0406326v1, https://arxiv.org/abs/math.DS/0406326

Chaotic maps